Echinocactus polycephalus is a cactus that occurs in the Mojave Desert region of Arizona, California, and Nevada. It also occurs in the Sonoran Desert region of southern California and northern Sonora, Mexico.

The plants grow in some of the most extreme arid environments in the American Southwest, such as Death Valley National Park, and the Mojave National Preserve of Southern California.

Description
The stems of Echinocactus polycephalus are sometimes solitary, but more often in clusters of as many as 30, each up to 0.6 m tall. The spines are yellow to red. The fruits are densely woolly, giving the common name cotton top cactus. The tendency of the cactus to cluster causes it to also be called many-headed barrel cactus.

They have a reputation for being difficult in cultivation, and are rarely seen in cactus collections.

References

External links

polycephalus
Cacti of Mexico
Cacti of the United States
Flora of Arizona
Flora of California
Flora of Nevada
Flora of Sonora
North American desert flora
Flora of the California desert regions
Flora of the Sonoran Deserts
Natural history of the Colorado Desert
Natural history of the Mojave Desert
~
Mojave National Preserve
Plants described in 1856